The 1962 Craven Filter Bathurst 100 was a motor race staged at the Mount Panorama Circuit near Bathurst in New South Wales, Australia on 23 April 1962. The race was contested over 26 laps at a total distance of approximately 100 miles and it was Round 2 of the 1962 Australian Drivers' Championship.

The race was won by Bib Stillwell driving a Cooper T53 Climax.

Results

References

Bathurst 100
Motorsport in Bathurst, New South Wales